Kévin Mbala (born 17 January 2001) is a French professional footballer who plays as a forward.

Club career
Mbala made his professional debut with Caen in a 1–1 Ligue 2 tie with Dunkerque on 20 April 2021.

On 24 June 2021, Mbala signed his first professional contract with Caen, a deal lasting until 2022. He was subsequently loaned to Championnat National side Bastia-Borgo until the end of the season.

International career
Mbala represented the France U17s in a 4–0 friendly loss to the Iran U17s on 28 September 2017.

Personal life 
Born in France, Mbala is of DR Congolese descent.

References

External links
 
 SM Caen Profile
 FFF Profile

2001 births
Living people
Sportspeople from Villeneuve-Saint-Georges
French sportspeople of Democratic Republic of the Congo descent
Black French sportspeople
French footballers
France youth international footballers
Stade Malherbe Caen players
Ligue 2 players
Championnat National 2 players
Championnat National 3 players
Championnat National players
Association football forwards
FC Bastia-Borgo players
Footballers from Val-de-Marne